Pencil is a 2016 Indian Tamil-language mystery thriller film written and directed by debutant Mani Nagaraj and produced by S. P. Ragavesh. The film is based on South Korean film 4th Period Mystery. The film stars G. V. Prakash Kumar and Sri Divya, with the former also composing the film's music. The film was released on 13 May 2016.

Plot
Shiva (G. V. Prakash Kumar) is the best student at his school. His rival Nithin (Shariq Hassan), the son of a leading film star and a spoiled brat, takes any and every opportunity to knock him down both verbally and physically, and the two are known enemies amongst the other students. Shiva doesn't find much happiness in school other than his classmate and love interest, Maya Srinivasan (Sri Divya) who later reciprocates his feelings after he saves her from a science lab accident.

One day, Nithin burns Shiva's thesis, and when Shiva finds out, he assaults Nithin in front of the whole school until the school management intervenes. Later, Shiva returns to his class to fight Nithin once again, but this time he finds him dead, with his neck stabbed repeatedly with a sharp pencil. Shiva removes the bloody pencil from Nithin's neck just as Maya shows up, catching him in a most incriminating position. Fortunately for him, she not only believes his innocence, but also offers to help him to solve the mystery and catch the real killer – a task made particularly urgent by the fact that in 40 minutes, the rest of the class will return and then the body will be discovered.

The suspects are many: the school driver with whom Nithin has a fight over an open wall behind the school; a local goon who enters the school through the open wall to meet his girlfriend, only to be driven out by Nithin; the chemistry teacher Sridhar (Thirumurugan), whose romantic relationship with his colleague Nandhini (Suja Varunee) ends after Nithin secretly records an intimate video of the two and blackmails Nandhini with that video to do what he says and Nithin's ex-girlfriend Indhulekha (Shamily Sukumar), whose 8-year-old friend Divya is accidentally killed by Nithin when she tries to break up with him and is constantly harassed and blackmailed by Nithin not to report to the school management or the police about the murder.

Maya and Shiva go on a wild goose chase to find out who the real killer is. Indhulekha and Shiva's friend, Napoleon help to find the killer. It then turns out that Divya's father is the killer because he wanted revenge for his daughter's death. Maya and Shiva also seem to be together but a small verbal fight ensues in between the two in the end.

Cast 

 G. V. Prakash Kumar as Shiva
 Sri Divya as Maya Srinivasan
 Shariq Hassan Khan as Nithin
 Urvashi as Rajeshwari
 Giriprasad Damodar as Vicky
 T. P. Gajendran as Sudhanthiram
 VTV Ganesh as Anthony Gonsalves
 Abhishek Shankar as Sundarajaan
 Thirumurugan as K. Sridhar
 Suja Varunee as Nandini
 Ravi Prakash as School Chairman
 Balaji Venugopal as Arun Kumar
 Arunraja Kamaraj as Selvaraj
 Yashika Aannand as Swimming Instructor
 Shamily Sukumar as Indhulekha
 Mirchi Shah as Napoleon
 Priya Mosh as Sowmya
 Sri Vidhya

Production
In October 2013, it was announced that music composer G. V. Prakash Kumar would make his debut as an actor with Mani Nagaraj's Pencil, a school based thriller film. The team initially approached Samantha and then Priya Anand however both were unable to sign on, due to their busy filming schedule, and subsequently Sri Divya was recruited to portray the lead female role. Shariq, son of actors Riyaz Khan and Uma Riyaz was announced to make his acting debut with a supporting role in the film. Director Mani Nagraj, who was a friend of Riyaz Khan offered the role of Nithin to his son Shariq Hassan, after seeing his photos on Facebook.

Still photographs from the film's initial photo shoot were released to the media in November 2013, earning positive reaction from critics.

Soundtrack
G. V. Prakash Kumar composed the soundtrack, which consists of 8 tracks including 4 songs, 3 karaoke tracks and 1 reprise. The album was released on 19 February 2015 in Suryan FM. Sify wrote, "Pencil is not an engaging album on the lines of Darling & is likely to work when viewed along with the visuals".

References

External links
 

2016 films
2010s Tamil-language films
Films scored by G. V. Prakash Kumar
Indian remakes of South Korean films
2016 directorial debut films
Films shot in Ishikawa Prefecture
Films shot in Tokyo